The Sydney Kings are an Australian men's professional basketball team competing in the National Basketball League (NBL). The team is based in Sydney, New South Wales, and play their home games at Qudos Bank Arena in Sydney Olympic Park.. The Kings were formed from a merger between the West Sydney Westars and the Sydney Supersonics in October 1987. The Kings have won five NBL championships in 2003, 2004, 2005, 2022 and 2023. They were the first team to win three consecutive championships in the NBL and currently sit third behind Melbourne United (six) and the Perth Wildcats (ten) for championships won.

History

1988–2002: First 15 years 
The Kings were formed from a merger between the West Sydney Westars and the Sydney Supersonics in October 1987. The team adopted the purple-and-gold colours traditionally linked with the most winning team in the NBA during the 1980s, the Los Angeles Lakers.

Before the merger, no Sydney-based teams had ever made the final four in NBL competition. That changed in 1989, when the Kings finished fifth with a 15–9 record and advanced to the semi-finals with a 2–1 win over the Melbourne Tigers. After splitting their first two games in the semi-finals, the Kings were humiliated by the Canberra Cannons 142–82 in the series-deciding third game.

Sydney made the playoffs in 1990, losing in the first round to the Brisbane Bullets. In 1992, led by imports Dwayne McClain (who was named to the All-NBL First Team) and Ken McClary (ranked 5th in the league in rebounds), the Kings finished second on the ladder. This time they advanced to the semi-finals and were beaten by the Tigers, who would eventually lose to the South-East Melbourne Magic in the championship series.

Over the next few years the Kings, despite the rich pockets of private owner Mike Wrublewski, earned a reputation for being chronic under-achievers. The team featured high-profile players like Leon Trimmingham, Mario Donaldson, Dean Uthoff and Phil Smyth during the mid-90s but they failed to make the playoffs in 1993 or 1995, and were eliminated in the first round in 1994 and 1996. The team soon received the nickname of 'The Violet Crumbles', a popular chocolate sold in purple wrapper; the joke being that the team was wrapped in purple and shattered under pressure. 'The Cardiac Kids' was another tag, for the team's frequency in getting involved in close, thrilling games.

After their 1996 elimination, the Kings would not make the NBL playoffs again until 2001, when they made it to the first round before being eliminated by the Townsville Crocodiles. Australian Olympic team guard Shane Heal was recruited to lead the team, and he finished second in the league in scoring average, behind Olympic teammate Andrew Gaze. Heal finished third in scoring average in the 2001–02 season, but the Kings again failed to make the playoffs.

2003–2008: The 1st Championship era 

For the 2002–03 season, Heal was joined by talented imports Chris Williams and Kavossy Franklin. The team also welcomed the NBL's all-time leader in coaching victories, Brian Goorjian. The Kings finished on top of the ladder with a 22–8 record, and swept the Perth Wildcats 2–0 in the grand final series to claim their first-ever championship.

With Goorjian able to implement his defensive tactics which were so successful with the Spectres, Magic and Titans in Melbourne, there seemed to be no stopping the Kings, who were able to recruit quality imports like 2002–03 league MVP Chris Williams. In addition, many Victorian groomed players who had previously played for Goorijan such as Jason Smith and Bradley Sheridan followed him north to Sydney.

Heal retired after the 2002–03 season, and C. J. Bruton was recruited to take his place, Jason Smith was signed after returning to the NBL after playing in Europe but unfortunately was injured 13 games into the season and was replaced by import Chris Carrawell. The Kings started the 2003–04 season with 10 successive wins, and would eventually win their second championship after their best-of-five grand final series with crosstown rivals West Sydney Razorbacks went down to the deciding fifth game. Kings player Matt Nielsen would win the regular season and finals MVP in 2003–04 before leaving to play overseas.

The Kings again performed strongly in the 2004–05 season despite a disastrous early game against Townsville which saw C. J. Bruton out for weeks with an elbow injury, and a season ending torn ACL for rookie of the year candidate Luke Kendall. The Kings managed without their starting backcourt until Bruton came back and they signed import big man Rolan Roberts. Arguably stronger than before the Kings finished on top of the ladder and crushed the Wollongong Hawks in three straight games to become the first team in Australian league history to win three consecutive championships. Jason Smith was named the NBL Finals Most Valuable Player.

In the 2005–06 season, the Kings again finished atop the ladder and made it to the grand final. Import centre Rolan Roberts suffered a torn pectoral muscle imitating a Vince Carter dunk during the All Star dunk competition and was replaced by Sedric Webber. In the finals they were swept 3–0 by the Chris Anstey led Melbourne Tigers. The club was then purchased in 2006 for $2 million by the chairman of fuel technology company Firepower International, Tim Johnston. Johnston later sold a part share in 2007 to 31-year-old Dorry Kordahi, CEO and owner of DKM.

The 2006-07 season would see the Kings continue their success into the post-season despite losing star guard CJ Bruton in the previous off-season to the Brisbane Bullets. The Kings faced off against the Bruton led Bullets in the semi-finals losing 2-0 whilst captain and key player Jason Smith attempted to play through a broken hand.

A finals rematch was on the table for the Kings in the 2007-08 season facing off againt the Melbourne Tigers once again. The series this time would go to the deciding 5th game, which amongst rumors of a potential collapse for the club and uncertainty around playing contracts and future, saw the Kings lose 3-2 to the Tigers at home.

2008–2010: Club demise 
On 24 March 2008, coach Brian Goorjian quit the club after a mutual agreement, and on 12 June 2008, the NBL terminated the Sydney team's licence as Firepower collapsed and the Kings were unable to pay player salaries.

2010–2012: Kings relaunch 
Under a revised management structure and ownership, the Sydney Kings relaunched for the 2010–11 NBL season, returning to the league after a two-year absence. However, despite big-named additions such as Julian Khazzouh, Ben Madgen and Luke Martin, the Kings in their first season back finished in last place on the ladder with an 8–20 record.

Due to the 2011 NBA Lockout, Australia's highest profile basketballer, former Milwaukee Bucks centre Andrew Bogut, was looking to play in the NBL during the 2011–12 season. He was linked with the Adelaide 36ers, the Gold Coast Blaze and the Kings, whom Bogut had supported when growing up in Australia. Sydney was favored to secure his services and Bogut ultimately chose to make his NBL debut with the Kings. However, the insurance to cover his remaining US$39 million contract with the Bucks couldn't be resolved, leaving the Kings and the NBL without the services of Australia's highest profile player. It was expected that Bogut's signing would see an increase in Kings membership and league attendances. Despite not being able to play, Bogut later expressed interest in joining the Kings' coaching staff during the lockout to help the club. This ultimately did not happen either.

The Kings fared better in 2011–12, finishing the season in seventh spot with an 11–17 record.

2012–2018: Continued struggles 
The Kings continued to struggle over the ensuing six years, qualifying just once (2012–13) for the playoffs in their eight seasons since returning to the league, and finishing with a losing record in the regular season in each of their eight seasons. In November 2015, the club played their 800th game in franchise history. Australian basketball icon Andrew Gaze was named head coach of the team on a three-year deal starting with the 2016–17 season. The team recruited big names Kevin Lisch, Brad Newley and Aleks Marić plus imports Greg Whittington and Michael Bryson for the 2016–17 season; however after starting the season with five wins in their opening six games, the Kings won just eight of their remaining 22 games and missed the playoffs.

Before the 2017–18 season, the team recruited imports Perry Ellis and Travis Leslie plus small forward Todd Blanchfield; however fared no better, losing 16 of their first 21 games as Lisch suffered a calf injury that would force him to miss most of the regular season. Late in the campaign the club brought in 2016–17 NBL MVP Jerome Randle and big man Jeremy Tyler. Randle led the team to six wins in their final seven games and was named to the All-NBL Second Team, but the Kings missed the playoffs for the fifth consecutive season.

2018–2021: Return to the finals 
The 2018–19 season was the Kings' 30th anniversary season in the NBL. On 24 April 2018, the Kings announced the signing of Australian basketball icon, Andrew Bogut. In that same offseason, the Kings became the first beneficiary of the NBL's new Next Stars program, which offers a professional option immediately out of secondary school to Americans (who are currently barred from the NBA draft until one year after graduation), as well as Australians and New Zealanders considering U.S. college basketball. Under the program, the team signed American Brian Bowen. After a 18–10 record across the 2018–19 season, the club recorded their first finals appearance since 2013 however lost 2–0 to Melbourne United in the semi-finals. Andrew Bogut would receive MVP honours becoming the 3rd King to receive the award and the first in 15 years.

After Andrew Gaze left the club under a mutual agreement, Will Weaver was signed as the new head coach. In Weaver's first season with the club, the Kings were minor champions for the first time in over a decade and made it through to the grand final series, however after three games the Kings indicated they did not wish to proceed due to the COVID-19 pandemic and forfeited the series to the Perth Wildcats.

2021–Present: The 2nd Championship Era 
In the 2021–22 season, the Kings won 13 straight games, equalling the second longest winning streak in franchise history set between the end of the 2003 season and the beginning of 2004. Jaylen Adams received MVP honours becoming the 4th King to receive the award. Sydney would go on to sweep both the Illawarra Hawks and Tasmania Jack Jumpers en route to the franchise's 4th NBL championship. Xavier Cooks received the 2021-22 Finals Most Valuable Player award.

The 2022–23 season saw the Kings retain a large portion of their local talent but enlist a new import trio from the likes of Derrick Walton, Justin Simon and Tim Soares. The Kings would continue their dominant performance from the previous season leading to a 19-9 record and the minor premiership, with captain Xavier Cooks taking the honours of MVP, the 5th in Kings history and 3rd in the last 5 years. The finals would prove to be a more arduous journey than the 2022 finals having to face the 3rd seeded Cairns Taipans in the semi-finals after the Taipans lost their first seeding game, who the Kings would go on to defeat 2-1. The New Zealand Breakers would face the Kings in the Grand Final series with both franchises competing for their 5th championship. The Kings defeated the Breakers 3-2 in the best of 5 series after a comeback game 5 win at home to lift the franchise to back-to-back titles. Derrick Walton was named 2022-23 Finals Most Valuable Player.

Home arena 
The Sydney Kings' first home venue was the State Sports Centre located at Homebush Bay. After playing at the 5,006-seat venue in 1988 and 1989, the Kings then moved into Sydney's largest indoor venue, the 12,500-seat Sydney Entertainment Centre in 1990. The SEC, known for Kings games as "The Kingdome", would be the Kings' home until the team moved back to Homebush Bay in 1999 and into the new, 18,200-capacity Sydney Superdome which had been built as the main basketball and gymnastics venue for the 2000 Summer Olympics held in Sydney.

Despite attracting an NBL record 17,143 crowd for their opening-round game in the 1999/2000 season against the Canberra Cannons (played as a double header with the West Sydney Razorbacks playing the Brisbane Bullets), the Kings' time at the Superdome only lasted three years. After the club went into voluntary administration following the 2001–02 season and was then purchased by a new investment group, the franchise decided to move back to the Entertainment Centre in 2002, citing falling attendances and the high cost of playing their games at the NBA-size venue. It was also speculated at the time that the core of the Kings fan base came from the eastern and northern suburbs of Sydney and that fans were not enthused about having to travel to Homebush Bay for games.

The Kings moved back to the Entertainment Centre in 2002, where they remained until 2015, though they were forced to move one game in the 2012–13 NBL season to the State Sports Centre due to a pre-booked event taking priority at the Entertainment Centre. At its closing in 2015, the SEC had a basketball capacity of 10,517 (with curtains blocking off seats behind the basket to reduce capacity) giving the Kings the second-largest capacity venue in the NBL behind the 14,846-seat Perth Arena, though as the SEC was opened in 1983 it also gave the Kings the league's oldest venue.

The Kings moved back to Homebush Bay midway through the 2015–16 season due to the SEC being demolished to make way for an apartment complex and convention centre. On 13 March 2016, the Kings came under new management and were subsequently moved back to the Superdome (Qudos Bank Arena) for the 2016–17 season. During the regular season, the Kings curtained off the upper deck of the Qudos Bank Arena (depending on ticket demand), leaving capacity at approximately 9,000. In the final home game of the 2016–17 season, the Kings drew 11,005 fans to their game against Melbourne United – at the time, the second largest home crowd in franchise history.

In the 2019–20 season alone, six of the top ten home crowds in franchise history attended games at Qudos Bank Arena.

The Kings averaged 10,012 fans per home game in the 2019–20 NBL season – the largest per-game average at home in franchise history and became the first Sydney Kings team to ever average more than 10,000 fans per home game. The total home fan attendance for the season was 140,168 – the largest in franchise history and nearly 20,000 fans more than the previous record set in 1994.

Attendance Records

The Sydney Kings have set attendance records for the league on five occasions while playing at the Superdome, the largest capacity arena in the NBL.

In the 1999/2000 season, the Kings hosted a double header at the Superdome with the West Sydney Razorbacks playing the Brisbane Bullets and the Kings playing the Canberra Cannons. This double header set a league record of 17,143 fans in attendance.

In a game against the Illawarra Hawks on 17 November 2019, the Kings set the all-time NBL single game attendance record with 17,514 the Superdome. A major drawcard for the game was future NBA star and social media icon LaMelo Ball playing for the Hawks.

In Game Three of the 2022 NBL Grand Final series against the Tasmania Jack Jumpers at Qudos Bank Arena, the team attracted a crowd of 16,149 – then the biggest playoff crowd in NBL history and the third-largest crowd overall in NBL history.

In the Grand Final Series of the 2022/2023 season against the New Zealand Breakers the Sydney Kings set the new single game attendance record and playoff game attendance record twice. With the Kings having home court advantage, Games 1, 3 and 5 were played at the Superdome. On Friday 10 March 2023, a new record of 18,049 attended Game 3 of the series.

Just five days later with the series at tied 2 wins each, the Kings prevailed in Game 5 to win the championship in front of another record attendance of 18,124.

Home arena by Year:

 State Sports Centre (1988–1989, 2012, 2016)
 Sydney Entertainment Centre (1990–1999, 2002–2008, 2010–2015)
 Sydney Superdome (1999–2002, 2016–present)

Honour and awards 

NBL champions (5)
 2003, 2004, 2005, 2022, 2023

Regular season champions (7)
 2003, 2004, 2005, 2006, 2008, 2020, 2023

Grand Final Appearances (8) 
 2003, 2004, 2005, 2006, 2008, 2020, 2022, 2023

Finals Appearances (17) 
 1989, 1990, 1992, 1994, 1996, 2001, 2003, 2004, 2005, 2006, 2007, 2008, 2013, 2019, 2020, 2022, 2023

NBL Most Valuable Player
 Chris Williams – 2003
 Matthew Nielsen – 2004
 Andrew Bogut – 2019
 Jaylen Adams – 2022
 Xavier Cooks – 2023

NBL Grand Final MVP
 Chris Williams – 2003
 Matthew Nielsen – 2004
 Jason Smith – 2005
 Xavier Cooks – 2022
 Derrick Walton – 2023

All-NBL First Team
 Dwayne McClain – 1992
 Leon Trimmingham – 1994
 Shane Heal – 2003
 Chris Williams – 2003
 Matthew Nielsen – 2004
 Jason Smith – 2005
 C. J. Bruton – 2006
 Mark Worthington – 2008
 Julian Khazzouh – 2011, 2012
 Ben Madgen – 2013
 Andrew Ogilvy – 2014
 Josh Childress – 2015
 Andrew Bogut – 2019
 Jae'Sean Tate – 2020
 Jaylen Adams – 2022
 Derrick Walton – 2023
 Xavier Cooks – 2023

All-NBL Second Team
 Shane Heal – 2001
 Matthew Nielsen – 2001, 2003
 Ebi Ere – 2004
 Jason Smith – 2006
 Sam Young – 2014
 Kevin Lisch – 2017
 Brad Newley – 2017
 Jerome Randle – 2018, 2019
 Casper Ware – 2020, 2021
 Andrew Bogut – 2020
 Xavier Cooks – 2022

All-NBL Third Team
 Shane Heal – 2002
 Kavossy Franklin – 2003
 C. J. Bruton – 2004
 Dontaye Draper – 2008
 Ian Crosswhite – 2013

NBL Coach of the Year
 Brian Goorjian – 2008

NBL Rookie of the Year
 Matthew Nielsen – 1997
 Derek Moore – 2000
 Travis Lane – 2002
 Gary Boodnikoff – 2003
 Mark Worthington – 2006
 Ben Madgen – 2011
 Anatoly Bose – 2012
 Angus Brandt – 2015
 Isaac Humphries – 2018

NBL Best Defensive Player
 Isaac Burton – 1996
 Andrew Bogut – 2019

NBL Best Sixth Man
 Dontaye Draper – 2008

NBL Most Improved Player
 Ben Madgen – 2013

Season by season

Current roster

Notable players 

  Jaylen Adams
  David Barlow
  Drew Barry
  Jerome Beasley
  Tony Bennett
  Steve Blake
  Todd Blanchfield
  Andrew Bogut
  Bruce Bolden
 / Anatoly Bose
  Brian Bowen
  Angus Brandt
  Kevin Brooks
 / C. J. Bruton
  Evers Burns
  Jason Cadee
  Steve Carfino
  Rhys Carter
  Josh Childress
  Randolph Childress
  Ian Clark
  Brad Dalton
  Mark Dalton
  Ian Davies
  Mark Dickel
  Dontaye Draper
  Acie Earl
 / Ebi Ere
  Trey Gilder
  Al Harrington
  James Harvey
  Shane Heal
  Russell Hinder
  Isaac Humphries
  Stephen Jackson
  Damion James
  Luke Kendall
  Damian Keogh
  Julian Khazzouh
  Daniel Kickert
  Michael Kingma
  Travis Leslie
 / Kevin Lisch
  Didi Louzada
  Ben Madgen
 / Aleks Marić
  Steven Marković
  Jarell Martin 
  Luke Martin
  Dwayne McClain
  Brad Newley
  Matthew Nielsen
 / Matt Nover
 / Andrew Ogilvy
  Josh Powell
 / Dion Prewster
 / Jerome Randle
 / E. J. Rowland
  Damien Ryan
  Glen Saville
  Bradley Sheridan
  Amritpal Singh
  Jason Smith
  Phil Smyth
  Jae'Sean Tate
  Aaron Trahair
  Jeremy Tyler
  Casper Ware
  David Wear
  Jarrad Weeks
  Brett Wheeler
  Chris Williams
  Tom Wilson
  Mark Worthington
 / Sam Young

25th Anniversary Team 
On 10 October 2013, the Sydney Kings announced their best team from the first 25 years of the club at their 2013–14 Season Launch at the Australian Museum. Three-time championship winner with the Kings Brian Goorjian was named head coach of the 25th Anniversary Team, while Jason Smith was bestowed the honour as captain of the team.

Depth chart 
Coaches
 Head Coach:  /  Brian Goorjian

Wall of Legends 

The club honours players, coaches and administrators who have made a significant contribution to the club during its existence in the competition. These are signified with banners that are hung at the stage end of Qudos Bank Arena.

Currently the Wall of Legends stands at 13, with the most recent inductions being made at halftime of the Kings vs Melbourne United match on 28 January 2018.
 Shane Heal, player
 Steve Carfino, player
 Tim Morrissey, player
 Jason Smith, player
 Dean Uthoff, player
 Mike Wrublewski, founder
 Bob Turner, coach
 Damian Keogh, player
 Mark Dalton, player
 Matthew Nielsen, player
 Brian Goorjian, coach
 C. J. Bruton, player
 Lorraine Landon, administrator

Preseason games against NBA teams

References

External links 
 
 "Championship History: The Sydney Kings" at nbl.com.au

 
National Basketball League (Australia) teams
Sports teams in Sydney
Basketball teams established in 1988
Basketball teams in New South Wales
1988 establishments in Australia